Exaucée Kizinga Ndjoli (born 31 January 2004), known as Exaucée Kizinga, is a DR Congolese footballer, who plays as a left winger and a left back for Ataşehir Belediyespor in the Turkish Women's Super League, and the DR Congo women's national team.

Club career
In 2022, Kizinga moved to Turkey to play in the Turkish Women's Super League for Ataşehir Belediyespor.

International career
Kizinga capped for the DR Congo at senior level during the 2020 CAF Women's Olympic Qualifying Tournament (third round).

See also
 List of Democratic Republic of the Congo women's international footballers

References

External links

2004 births
Living people
Footballers from Kinshasa
Democratic Republic of the Congo women's footballers
Women's association football wingers
Women's association football fullbacks
Ataşehir Belediyespor players
Turkish Women's Football Super League players
Democratic Republic of the Congo women's international footballers
Democratic Republic of the Congo expatriate footballers
Democratic Republic of the Congo expatriate sportspeople in Turkey
Expatriate women's footballers in Turkey
21st-century Democratic Republic of the Congo people